Alonso de Cordova y Figueroa (? - August 9, 1698) Spanish soldier born in Concepción, Chile, son of Alonso de Figueroa y Córdoba and father of the historian Pedro de Cordova y Figueroa.  He served as lieutenant, captain of infantry and of cavalry in Lota and San Carlos de Austria; lieutenant general of cavalry and Sargento Mayor of the Captaincy General of Chile.

Sources 
 José Toribio Medina,  Diccionario biográfico colonial de Chile, Impr. Elziviriana, Santiago, 1906, Pj. 211 CORDOBA Y FIGUEROA (ALONSO DE)

1698 deaths
17th-century Chilean people
Spanish generals
17th-century Spanish military personnel
Year of birth unknown